Yousef Saleh Shriha (born 18 November 1991) is a Libyan taekwondo athlete.

He represented his country at the 2016 Summer Olympics in Rio de Janeiro in the men's 58 kg category, where he was defeated by Carlos Navarro in the first round.

References

1991 births
Living people
Libyan male taekwondo practitioners
Olympic taekwondo practitioners of Libya
Taekwondo practitioners at the 2016 Summer Olympics
21st-century Libyan people
Competitors at the 2018 Mediterranean Games